Louisiana Famous Fried Chicken is an American fast food chain that started in 1976 in Los Angeles by Joe Dion, a Michigan native.

The company is a franchise venture where licensees pay for license rights and a flour and red pepper recipe used to coat the dishes but are otherwise not restricted. Apart from Los Angeles, there are also locations in Pasadena as well as other locations in California, and in Arizona, Georgia, Illinois, Michigan, North Carolina and Texas.

By 2017 there were 148 Louisiana Famous Fried Chicken restaurants in the United States, mostly run by Cambodians, and ownership of the company had been transferred to Michael P. Eng.

See also

 List of fast-food chicken restaurants
List of fast food restaurant chains

References

External links

1976 establishments in California
Chicken chains of the United States
Fast-food chains of the United States
Fast-food poultry restaurants
Restaurants established in 1976
Restaurants in Los Angeles